The 1996 Rolling Rock U.S. Men's Clay Court Championships was a men's tennis tournament played on outdoor clay courts in Pinehurst, North Carolina in the United States and was part of the World Series of the 1996 ATP Tour. It was the 28th edition of the tournament and ran from May 6 through May 12, 1996. Unseeded Fernando Meligeni won the singles title.

Finals

Singles

 Fernando Meligeni defeated  Mats Wilander 6–4, 6–2
 It was Meligeni's 2nd title of the year and the 3rd of his career.

Doubles

 Pat Cash /  Patrick Rafter defeated  Ken Flach /  David Wheaton 6–2, 6–3
 It was Cash's only title of the year and the 19th of his career. It was Rafter's only title of the year and the 4th of his career.

References

External links
 Official website
 ATP tournament profile